John Beaton (born March 2, 1950) is a former Grey Cup champion defensive back who played eight seasons in the Canadian Football League, winning two Grey Cup Championships.

Beaton started his career with the Edmonton Eskimos, playing 4 seasons and 47 games, intercepting 10 passes, and playing in three Grey Cup games, winning in 1975 against the Montreal Alouettes. In 1976 he joined the Larks for two seasons, playing 17 games and picking off 4 passes, and winning another Grey Cup against his old team in 1977. He finished with 3 seasons with the BC Lions, where he played 40 games with 6 interceptions.

External links
CFLapedia Bio
Fanbase Bio

Notes

1950 births
Canadian football people from Vancouver
Simon Fraser Clan football players
Living people
Montreal Alouettes players
Edmonton Elks players
BC Lions players
Players of Canadian football from British Columbia